Laura Thweatt (born December 17, 1988) is an American long-distance runner.

Early life, family and education

Thweatt was born in Durango, Colorado. She began running competitively at Durango High School for which she placed 2nd at the 2006 Colorado 5A cross country state championship.

She attended the University of Colorado.

College athletic career
Thweatt competed for the University of Colorado where she was a five time All-Big 12 Conference performer and Academic All-Big 12. She was coached by Mark Wetmore. Her teammates included future Olympic medalists Jenny Simpson and Emma Coburn, Olympic steeplechaser Billy Nelson, Brent and Sara Vaughn, and Bradley Harkrader.

Professional athletic career

USA National Championships

Track and Field
Laura Thweatt ran 2016 Summer Olympics standard in 10,000 meters in 31:52.94 at the 2016 Stanford Invitational.

Cross Country
Thweatt won the title at the 2013 and 2014 USATF National Club Cross Country Championships.

In 2015, Thweatt won the USA Cross Country Championships.  She also competed in the 2015 IAAF World Cross Country Championships where she finished 29th.

Road
Thweatt finished 3rd in 2013 .US National Road Racing Championships in 39:15 (5:16 per mile) over 12 km.

Thweatt finished 2nd in 2015 Jacksonville Gate River Run 15 km USATF Road Championships in 50:50. She won 2015 Rock 'n' Roll Virginia Beach Half Marathon and debut at 2015 TCS New York City Marathon 7th place in 2:28:23.

At 2016 USATF 5 km Championships hosted by CVS Downtown 5K in Providence Rhode Island, Thweatt finished 6th in 16:07.

Thweatt finished 6th in 2017 London Marathon in 2:25:38 (5:34 per mile) over 42.2 km.

In 2019, she finished 5th in the 2019 NYRR New York Mini 10K, which also served as the USATF Women's 10K Championship. Thweatt placed 8th at 2019 Chicago Marathon in 2:29:06.

She trained under coach Joe Bosshard for the 2020 Olympics but missed a place on the U.S. Olympic Team by 16 seconds when Thweatt placed 5th at Atlanta hosted United States Olympic Marathon Trials in February 2020.

Thweatt placed 8th in 2:27:00 at 2021 New York marathon.

Personal life
Thweatt has resided in Superior, Colorado and Louisville, Colorado.

References

External links

Living people
1988 births
Track and field athletes from Colorado
Sportspeople from Boulder, Colorado
American female middle-distance runners
American female long-distance runners
American female cross country runners
World Athletics Championships athletes for the United States
Colorado Buffaloes women's track and field athletes
Colorado Buffaloes women's cross country runners
21st-century American women